Kösreli is a village in the Silopi district of Şırnak Province in Turkey. The village is populated by Assyrians and had a population of 49 in 2021.

Notable people 

 Erol Dora

References 

Villages in Silopi District
Assyrian communities in Turkey